

National student team
4th World University Futsal Championship 1994 in Nicosia, Cyprus

Futsal European Clubs Championship

Top League

3rd Russian futsal championship 1994/1995

Promotion tournament

National Cup

Final Four

Top League Cup

First League

First stage

First group

Second group

Third group

Fourth group

Fifth group

Second stage

Group A

Group B
 Stroitel-7 Chelyabinsk
 Polese St. Petersburg

Women's League

3rd Women's Russian futsal championship 1994/1995

Top League Final standing

First League Final standing

Women's National Cup

References

Russia
Seasons in Russian futsal
futsal
futsal